Elo Tostenæs (born 9 September 1935) is a Danish rower. He competed at the 1956 Summer Olympics and the 1960 Summer Olympics.

References

1935 births
Living people
Danish male rowers
Olympic rowers of Denmark
Rowers at the 1956 Summer Olympics
Rowers at the 1960 Summer Olympics
Rowers from Copenhagen